Markus Grübl (born 31 August 1989) is a German footballer who plays as a defender for TSV 1880 Wasserburg.

Career
Grübl made his professional debut for Wacker Burghausen on 14 February 2009 in the 3. Liga, coming on as a substitute in the 63rd minute for Martin Oslislo against Fortuna Düsseldorf, with the match finishing as a 1–3 away loss.

References

External links
 Profile at DFB.de
 Profile at kicker.de

1989 births
Living people
People from Eggenfelden
Sportspeople from Lower Bavaria
Footballers from Bavaria
German footballers
Association football defenders
SV Wacker Burghausen players
3. Liga players
Regionalliga players
TSV Buchbach players